Virgin Peak is the highest point of Virgin Mountain range, located northeast of Lake Mead, in the state of Clark County, Nevada, United States. The peak has an elevation of 8074 ft (2461 m) and a prominence of 3183 ft (970 m). The peak is part of the Gold Butte National Monument, northeast of Las Vegas.

Geography 
The peak is located nine miles from the city of Mesquite. The terrain around the peak is very rugged and rocky, thus few hikers visit. Many red rock formations can be viewed while exploring the peak.

The south ridge is the preferred route hikers choose.

The mountain's ridge is mostly formed out of carbonate rock. The east facing slopes are shady and tall conifer trees like Yellow Pine can be seen.

References 

Mountains of Nevada